Pokémon Battle Frontier may refer to:

The Battle Frontier, a series of locations in Pokémon
Pokémon: Battle Frontier, the 2005 ninth season of the Pokémon animated series 
Pokémon Battle Frontier (manga), a manga

See also
 Battlefront (disambiguation)